Sibongile Ayanda Sizwesiyanda Jiya (born 18 June 1987) known professionally as Ayanda Jiya, is a South African singer, songwriter and record producer, born in Klerksdorp, North West. She was signed under TinismDotc0m in 2010. Her single, "Go Go Girl" was released in 2014, which earned her a nomination for Best RnB Single at the 14th ceremony of Metro FM Music Awards. She later departed from TinismDotc0m and partnered with Zephbeats Studios.

She released her first EP under TinismDotc0m titled V.I.C (Very Intimate Conversations) (2014) which respectively produced the single including "Go Go Girl" and "Wrecking My Brain". The EP was removed from all streaming and digital platforms when she left TinismDotc0m in 2015. in 2017 they released Jiya's second EP, To Whom It May Concern.

Life and career

Early life and career beginnings 
Ayanda Jiya was born in Klerksdorp, a city in the North West Province. In 2007, she met Wax Lyrikal, a rapper and producer. Ayanda recorded her first song, entitled "Rescue Me" with J.Smallz in Arcadia, Pretoria. In 2010, Ayanda and Michael Sathekge (Co-Founder of TinismDotc0m) created instrumentals which she recorded on. She then released a single titled "Don't Let Me Go" Produced by Wax Lyrikal. That was the first official song she recorded on the then-new indie label TinismDotc0m, which led to another song entitled "I'm Grateful". Ayanda Jiya later released another single titled "Happier Alone" produced by J.Smallz. She continued to work on her EP titled "Very Intimate Conversations (V.I.C)" which was released in 2014. The lead single "Go Go Girl" (sound engineered by J.Smallz and Trompie Beatmochini) granted her a nomination for the 'Best R&B Single' at the 14th Metro Fm Awards. The nomination led to international recognition and in 2016 she was granted to perform in Sri Lanka performing in their Capital City Colombo at their annual Jazz Festival.

Growth and independence 
In 2015 Ayanda Jiya parted ways with the label TinismDotc0m and took a break from the music scene. After a two-year break from music, she decided to go independent and start her own record label, "Ayandastand Music". In the same year former label member Ginger Trill, introduced Ayanda to Record Producer/Sound Engineer Simphiwe Mhlongo, known as Zeph/Zephbeats. Zephbeats, who has worked with the likes of Taiylor Manson, Riky Rick, Stogie T and A-Reece joined ventures with Ayandastand Music. Together they worked on her 2nd EP 'To Whom It May Concern', which went Number 1 on iTunes and Google Play. Ayanda's debut project titled 'AYANDASTAND' dropped on 8 August 2019 and debuted at number one on iTunes and Google Play on the day of release. Guest features on the album include Stogie T, Ziyon and Naomi Parchment. The album was musically directed, produced and mixed by Producer/Sound Engineer Zephbeats, who has been working closely with Jiya since 2017.

Ayanda has worked with many South African artists, featuring on Lady Zamar's album King Zamar. She also appears on A-Reece's second studio album From Me to You and Only You, Stogie T's Honey and Pain Mixtape, Flame's CandyMan album, Ralf Gum's Progression album, Ginger Trill's Gang Tapes EP and Sir LSG's Moving Circle album.

Discography

Albums

Extended Play

Awards and nominations

References

External links 

Official website

1987 births
Living people
South African singer-songwriters
21st-century South African women singers
Soul musicians
South African rhythm and blues musicians